Andrey Yurkov (sometimes listed as Andrey Jurkov, born 18 November 1983) is a Russian bobsledder who has competed since 2007. His best World Cup finish was third in a four-man event at Altenberg, Germany in December 2009.

Yurkov's team finished eighth in the four-man bobsleigh competition at the 2010 Winter Olympics in Turin.

References
 

1983 births
Living people
Russian male bobsledders
Bobsledders at the 2010 Winter Olympics
Olympic bobsledders of Russia
Sportspeople from Krasnoyarsk
Place of birth missing (living people)